The eighth season of La Voz premiered March 12, 2019 on Azteca Uno. Lupillo Rivera, Belinda, Yahir, and Ricardo Montaner  joined as new coaches replacing Natalia Jiménez, Carlos Rivera, Anitta, and Maluma, respectively. Whereas, Jimena Pérez became the new host of the show.

This is the first season being produced by TV Azteca after they acquired the show's rights from Televisa. Due to the change of broadcast channel, it featured new coaches and host, as well as a few format changes.

This season the coaches are supposed to close their teams with 51 members each, instead of the usual 12. Amother change were the Knockouts which came before the Battles, and featured 3 artists facing each other instead of 2. After the Knockouts, came the Battles, Top 3, and finally the Live Shows.

On Tuesday, July 1, 2019, Fátima Domínguez was announced the winner and crowned  La Voz México 2019, alongside her coach Lupillo Rivera. This makes the third coach last name "Rivera" to win the show, Jenni Rivera being Lupillo's sister.

Coaches 

Due to the show's rights being obtained by TV Azteca starting in 2020, it had to feature a brand new cast due to former coaches having contract with Televisa. On February 12, 2019, TV Azteca announced Belinda as their first coach. Former contestant of Azteca's high-rated La Academia, and now successful singer, Yahir and international star, Ricardo Montaner were confirmed as the second and third coaches of the new edition. Later, Jimena Pérez was announced as the new host. Lupillo Rivera closed the coach openings, as the final coach announced.

Teams 
 Color key

Blind Auditions 

Color key

Episode 1 (March 12)
At the beginning of the episode, each coach performed a solo song: Lupillo Rivera sang "Mi Gusto Es", Yahir sang "Fue Ella, Fui Yo", Belinda sang "Luz Sin Gravedad" and Ricardo Montaner sang "La Cima del Cielo".

Episode 2 (March 13)

Episode 3 (March 19)

Episode 24 (May 20)

The Knockouts

The Battles 

The Battle Round started June 5. The coaches can steal two losing artists from other coaches. Contestants who win their battle or are stolen by another coach will advance to the Top 3 Round.

Color key:

Top 3 

The Top 3 Round started on June 18, and consisted of three episodes. During this round each coach chooses their best three artists of their choice to advance to the live shows. After each individual performance, it is up to their coach if the artist deserves one of the three chairs. If they do, artist on Chair #3 is eliminated in favor of the new artist. If their coach decides not to give a chair they are automatically eliminated. The 3 artists (per team) that remain in a chair until the end of this round will advance to the Quarterfinals.

Color key

Live Shows 

Color key:

Week 1, Day 1: Quarterfinals (June 25)

Week 1, Day 2: Semifinal (June 26)

Week 2: Live Finale (July 1) 
The finale aired July 1, 2019 with the Top 4 artists. All artists performed one solo song and one song alongside their coach. After, the host announced the fourth and third place. The two remainining artists performed a song they've sang during the show with the public's vote being announced at the end of the night. Fátima Domínguez was crowned the winner of the season.

Color key:

Elimination Chart

Overall 
Color key
Artist's info

Result details

References

Mexico
2019 Mexican television seasons